St. Jerome's College (Arts and Science), is a general degree college located in Anandhanadarkudy (Nagercoil), Kanyakumari district, Tamil Nadu. It was established in the year 2009. The college is affiliated with Manonmaniam Sundaranar University. This college offers different courses in arts, commerce and science.

Departments

Science

Physics
Mathematics
Computer Science
Computer Application

Arts and Commerce

Tamil
English
Business Administration
Commerce

Accreditation
The college is  recognized by the University Grants Commission (UGC).

References

External links

2009 establishments in Tamil Nadu
Educational institutions established in 2009
Colleges affiliated to Manonmaniam Sundaranar University
Universities and colleges in Kanyakumari district